The J/111 is an American sailboat that was designed by Alan Johnstone as a one-design racer-cruiser and first built in 2010. The boat is named for its length overall in decimeters.

The design is a World Sailing international class keelboat.

Production
The design has been built by J/Boats in the United States, since 2010 and remains in production.

Design
The J/111 is a recreational keelboat, built predominantly of fiberglass. Construction is glass reinforced polyester and a balsa fiberglass vinylester sandwich via vacuum bag molding. It has a fractional sloop rig with a keel-stepped carbon fiber mast with two sets of swept spreaders, an aluminum boom and steel rod rigging. It has a retractable bowsprit, a plumb stem, an open and  sightly reverse transom, an internally mounted spade-type rudder controlled by a wheel and a fixed cast iron, fin keel with a weighted lead bulb. It displaces  and carries  of ballast.

The holding tank is 

The design has sleeping accommodation for six to eight people, with a double "V"-berth in the bow cabin, two straight settee berths in the main cabin around a folding table, two aft quarter berths, plus two optional fold-up sea-berths. The galley is located on the port side at the companionway ladder. The galley is "L"-shaped and is equipped with a two-burner stove and a sink. A navigation station is opposite the galley, on the starboard side. The enclosed head is located just aft of the bow cabin on the port side.

Operational history
The boat is supported by an active class club that organizes racing events, the J/111 Class Association.

See also
List of sailing boat types

References

External links

Keelboats
2010s sailboat type designs
Sailing yachts
Sailboat type designs by Alan Johnstone
Sailboat types built by J/Boats